Marshall House is a historic home located at Canandaigua in Ontario County, New York. It is a two-story, five bay center hall brick dwelling on a slightly raised basement.  Although built in 1844 with later alterations, it has characteristics of the Federal style.

It was listed on the National Register of Historic Places in 1984.

References

Houses on the National Register of Historic Places in New York (state)
Federal architecture in New York (state)
Italianate architecture in New York (state)
Houses completed in 1844
Houses in Ontario County, New York
National Register of Historic Places in Ontario County, New York